Scheimpflug Nunatak is a nunatak in the mouth of Deville Glacier on Arctowski Peninsula, on the west coast of Graham Land. Mapped by the Falkland Islands Dependencies Survey (FIDS) from photos taken by Hunting Aerosurveys Ltd. in 1956–57. Named by the United Kingdom Antarctic Place-Names Committee (UK-APC) in 1960 for Theodor Scheimpflug (1865–1911), Austrian pioneer of aerophotogrammetry.

Nunataks of Graham Land
Danco Coast